Xianning North railway station is a railway station on the Wuhan–Guangzhou high-speed railway. The station is located on the northern edge of Xianning's urban core, in Guanbuqiao of Xian'an District, Xianning, Hubei Province, China.

Other stations in Xianning
The station on the conventional Beijing–Guangzhou railway is known as Xianning railway station. It is located about 2 km from Xianning North.

The name "Xianning North railway station" was also used in early design documents for the station of the Wuchang–Xianning intercity railway. By the time of the opening of the railway in late 2013, that station renamed to Xianning East railway station.

References 

Railway stations in China opened in 2009
Xianning
Railway stations in Hubei
Stations on the Wuhan–Guangzhou High-Speed Railway